Pettingill is a surname. Notable people with the name include:

Pettingill family, an Australian crime family
Kath Pettingill (born 1931), Former brothel owner and matriarch of the Pettingill family
Kerry Pettingill (born 1958), retired American police officer, former chief of the Oklahoma Highway Patrol
Sewall Pettingill (1907–2001), American naturalist, author and filmmaker
Karuna Dharma  (1940–2014), born Joyce Adele Pettingill, American Buddhist scholar and nun